Liberty Township may refer to:

Arkansas
Liberty Township, Carroll County, Arkansas
Liberty Township, Dallas County, Arkansas, in Dallas County, Arkansas
Liberty Township, Independence County, Arkansas, in Independence County, Arkansas
Liberty Township, Ouachita County, Arkansas, in Ouachita County, Arkansas
Liberty Township, Pope County, Arkansas
Liberty Township, Saline County, Arkansas, in Saline County, Arkansas
Liberty Township, Stone County, Arkansas, in Stone County, Arkansas
Liberty Township, Van Buren County, Arkansas, in Van Buren County, Arkansas
Liberty Township, White County, Arkansas, in White County, Arkansas

Illinois
 Liberty Township, Adams County, Illinois
 Liberty Township, Effingham County, Illinois

Indiana
 Liberty Township, Carroll County, Indiana
 Liberty Township, Crawford County, Indiana
 Liberty Township, Delaware County, Indiana
 Liberty Township, Fulton County, Indiana
 Liberty Township, Grant County, Indiana
 Liberty Township, Hendricks County, Indiana
 Liberty Township, Henry County, Indiana
 Liberty Township, Howard County, Indiana
 Liberty Township, Parke County, Indiana
 Liberty Township, Porter County, Indiana
 Liberty Township, St. Joseph County, Indiana
 Liberty Township, Shelby County, Indiana
 Liberty Township, Tipton County, Indiana
 Liberty Township, Union County, Indiana
 Liberty Township, Wabash County, Indiana
 Liberty Township, Warren County, Indiana
 Liberty Township, Wells County, Indiana
 Liberty Township, White County, Indiana

Iowa
 Liberty Township, Buchanan County, Iowa
 Liberty Township, Cherokee County, Iowa
 Liberty Township, Clarke County, Iowa
 Liberty Township, Clinton County, Iowa
 Liberty Township, Dubuque County, Iowa, in Dubuque County, Iowa
 Liberty Township, Hamilton County, Iowa
 Liberty Township, Hancock County, Iowa
 Liberty Township, Jefferson County, Iowa
 Liberty Township, Johnson County, Iowa
 Liberty Township, Keokuk County, Iowa
 Liberty Township, Lucas County, Iowa
 Liberty Township, Marion County, Iowa, in Marion County, Iowa
 Liberty Township, Marshall County, Iowa
 Liberty Township, Mitchell County, Iowa
 Liberty Township, O'Brien County, Iowa
 Liberty Township, Plymouth County, Iowa
 Liberty Township, Ringgold County, Iowa
 Liberty Township, Scott County, Iowa
 Liberty Township, Warren County, Iowa, in Warren County, Iowa
 Liberty Township, Woodbury County, Iowa
 Liberty Township, Wright County, Iowa

Kansas
 Liberty Township, Barton County, Kansas
 Liberty Township, Clark County, Kansas
 Liberty Township, Coffey County, Kansas
 Liberty Township, Cowley County, Kansas
 Liberty Township, Decatur County, Kansas
 Liberty Township, Dickinson County, Kansas
 Liberty Township, Elk County, Kansas
 Liberty Township, Geary County, Kansas
 Liberty Township, Hamilton County, Kansas
 Liberty Township, Jackson County, Kansas
 Liberty Township, Kingman County, Kansas
 Liberty Township, Labette County, Kansas, in Labette County, Kansas
 Liberty Township, Linn County, Kansas, in Linn County, Kansas
 Liberty Township, Marion County, Kansas
 Liberty Township, Montgomery County, Kansas, in Montgomery County, Kansas
 Liberty Township, Osborne County, Kansas, in Osborne County, Kansas
 Liberty Township, Republic County, Kansas
 Liberty Township, Saline County, Kansas
 Liberty Township, Woodson County, Kansas, in Woodson County, Kansas

Michigan
Liberty Township, Jackson County, Michigan
Liberty Township, Wexford County, Michigan

Minnesota
Liberty Township, Beltrami County, Minnesota
Liberty Township, Itasca County, Minnesota
Liberty Township, Polk County, Minnesota

Missouri
Liberty Township, Adair County, Missouri
Liberty Township, Barry County, Missouri
Liberty Township, Bollinger County, Missouri
Liberty Township, Callaway County, Missouri
Liberty Township, Cape Girardeau County, Missouri
Liberty Township, Clay County, Missouri
Liberty Township, Cole County, Missouri
Liberty Township, Crawford County, Missouri
Liberty Township, Daviess County, Missouri
Liberty Township, Grundy County, Missouri
Liberty Township, Holt County, Missouri, in Holt County, Missouri
Liberty Township, Iron County, Missouri
Liberty Township, Knox County, Missouri
Liberty Township, Macon County, Missouri, in Macon County, Missouri
Liberty Township, Madison County, Missouri
Liberty Township, Marion County, Missouri
Liberty Township, Phelps County, Missouri
Liberty Township, Pulaski County, Missouri
Liberty Township, Putnam County, Missouri, in Putnam County, Missouri
Liberty Township, Saline County, Missouri
Liberty Township, St. Francois County, Missouri
Liberty Township, Schuyler County, Missouri
Liberty Township, Sullivan County, Missouri
Liberty Township, Stoddard County, Missouri
Liberty Township, Washington County, Missouri

Nebraska
Liberty Township, Fillmore County, Nebraska
Liberty Township, Gage County, Nebraska
Liberty Township, Kearney County, Nebraska
Liberty Township, Valley County, Nebraska

New Jersey
Liberty Township, New Jersey

Ohio
Liberty Township, Adams County, Ohio
Liberty Township, Butler County, Ohio
Liberty Township, Clinton County, Ohio
Liberty Township, Crawford County, Ohio
Liberty Township, Darke County, Ohio
Liberty Township, Delaware County, Ohio
Liberty Township, Fairfield County, Ohio
Liberty Township, Guernsey County, Ohio
Liberty Township, Hancock County, Ohio
Liberty Township, Hardin County, Ohio
Liberty Township, Henry County, Ohio
Liberty Township, Highland County, Ohio
Liberty Township, Jackson County, Ohio
Liberty Township, Knox County, Ohio
Liberty Township, Licking County, Ohio
Liberty Township, Logan County, Ohio
Liberty Township, Mercer County, Ohio
Liberty Township, Putnam County, Ohio
Liberty Township, Ross County, Ohio
Liberty Township, Seneca County, Ohio
Liberty Township, Trumbull County, Ohio
Liberty Township, Union County, Ohio
Liberty Township, Van Wert County, Ohio
Liberty Township, Washington County, Ohio
Liberty Township, Wood County, Ohio

Pennsylvania
Liberty Township, Adams County, Pennsylvania
Liberty Township, Allegheny County, Pennsylvania, a former township now part of Pittsburgh
Liberty Township, Bedford County, Pennsylvania
Liberty Township, Centre County, Pennsylvania
Liberty Township, McKean County, Pennsylvania
Liberty Township, Mercer County, Pennsylvania
Liberty Township, Montour County, Pennsylvania
Liberty Township, Susquehanna County, Pennsylvania
Liberty Township, Tioga County, Pennsylvania

South Dakota
Liberty Township, Beadle County, South Dakota, in Beadle County, South Dakota
Liberty Township, Brown County, South Dakota
Liberty Township, Day County, South Dakota, in Day County, South Dakota
Liberty Township, Edmunds County, South Dakota, in Edmunds County, South Dakota
Liberty Township, Hutchinson County, South Dakota, in Hutchinson County, South Dakota
Liberty Township, Perkins County, South Dakota, in Perkins County, South Dakota

Township name disambiguation pages